Laurie Moloney (born 28 April 1949) is a former Australian rules footballer who played with Essendon in the Victorian Football League (VFL). Used initially as a wingman, Moloney played his best football for Essendon as a back pocket.

He went to Oakleigh during the 1976 season, then was captain-coach of Queensland club Mayne in 1977. From 1978 to 1982 he played for Belconnen in the ACT, the last two years as captain-coach. In 1983 he left Australia for the United States, to take up a three-year posting with the US Department of Defence.

Notes

External links 

Laurie Moloney's profile at Australianfootball.com

Living people
1949 births
Australian rules footballers from Victoria (Australia)
Essendon Football Club players
Leongatha Football Club players
Oakleigh Football Club players
Mayne Australian Football Club players
Belconnen Football Club players